Kannada cinema, also known as Sandalwood, or Chandanavana, is the segment of Indian cinema dedicated to the production of motion pictures in the Kannada language widely spoken in the state of Karnataka. The 1934 film Sati Sulochana directed by Y. V. Rao was the first talkie film in the Kannada language. It was also the first film starring Subbaiah Naidu and Tripuramba, and was the first motion picture screened in the erstwhile Mysore Kingdom. The film was produced by Chamanlal Doongaji, who in 1932 founded South India Movietone in Bangalore.

Major literary works have been adapted to the Kannada screen such as B. V. Karanth's Chomana Dudi (1975), (based on Chomana Dudi by Shivaram Karanth), Girish Karnad's Kaadu (1973), (based on Kaadu by Srikrishna Alanahalli), Pattabhirama Reddy's Samskara (1970) (based on Samskara by U. R. Ananthamurthy), which won the Bronze Leopard at Locarno International Film Festival, and T. S. Nagabharana's Mysuru Mallige (1992), based on the works of poet K. S. Narasimhaswamy.

Kannada cinema is known for producing experimental works such as Girish Kasaravalli's Ghatashraddha (1977), which won the Ducats Award at the Manneham Film Festival Germany, Dweepa (2002), which won Best Film at Moscow International Film Festival, Singeetam Srinivasa Rao's silent film Pushpaka Vimana (1987), Ram Gopal Varma's docudrama Killing Veerappan (2016), Prashanth Neel's action franchise K. G. F. series being the highest-grossing Kannada film, and Rishab Shetty's Kantara (2022). 

Kannada cinema is reported to have 8% market share in the gross domestic box office collections for the period January to August 2022 making it the fourth biggest Indian film industry. The share rose to 9% by October 2022. The total gross collections of the top five Kannada movies of 2022 in first ten months was reported to be ₹1800 crores. The year 2022 witnessed the beginning of new era for the industry in terms of popularity, quality content and collections.

History

Early history

In 1934, the first Kannada talkie, Sati Sulochana, appeared in theatres, followed by Bhakta Dhruva (aka Dhruva Kumar). Sati Sulochana, starring Subbaiah Naidu and Tripuramba, was shot in Kolhapur at the Chatrapathi studio; most filming, sound recording, and post-production was done in Chennai.

In 1949, Honnappa Bhagavathar, who had earlier acted in Gubbi Veeranna's films, produced Bhakta Kumbara and starred in the lead role along with Pandaribai. In 1955, Bhagavathar again produced a Kannada film, Mahakavi Kalidasa, in which he introduced actress B. Saroja Devi. B. S. Ranga was an Indian photographer, actor, writer, producer and director made many landmark movies in Kannada, under Vikram Studios.

Mainstream
Matinee idol, Rajkumar entered Kannada cinema after his long stint as a dramatist with Gubbi Veeranna's Gubbi Drama Company, which he joined at the age of eight, before he got his first break as a lead in the 1954 film Bedara Kannappa.

He went on to essay a variety of roles and excelling in portraying mythological and historical characters in films such as Bhakta Kanakadasa (1960), Ranadheera Kanteerava (1960), Satya Harishchandra (1965), Immadi Pulikeshi (1967), Sri Krishnadevaraya (1970), Bhakta Kumbara (1974), Mayura (1975), Babruvahana (1977) and Bhakta Prahlada (1983). His wife Parvathamma Rajkumar founded Film production and distribution company, Vajreshwari Combines.

Vishnuvardhan entered Kannada cinema with the National Award-winning movie Vamsha Vriksha (1972) directed by Girish Karnad based on the novel written by S. L. Bhyrappa. His first lead role was in Naagarahaavu, directed by Puttanna Kanagal and based on a novel by T. R. Subba Rao. It was the first in Kannada film history to complete 100 days in three main theatres of Bangalore. In his 37-year career, he has played a variety of roles in more than 200 films.

With his debut in Puttanna Kanagal's National Award-winning Kannada film Naagarahaavu (1972), Ambareesh's acting career commenced with a brief phase of portraying antagonistic and supporting characters. After establishing himself as a lead actor portraying rebellious characters on screen in a number of commercially successful films, he earned the moniker "rebel star". He also earned the nickname Mandyada Gandu ( Man of Mandya)

Rajkumar, Vishnuvardhan and Ambareesh are collectively known as Kannada cinema's triumvirate.

Method actor Shankar Nag received the inaugural IFFI Best Actor Award (Male): Silver Peacock Award" at the 7th International Film Festival of India for his work in the film Ondanondu Kaladalli. He is the younger brother of actor Anant Nag. M. V. Vasudeva Rao, the first Kannada actor to win National Film Award for Best Actor, was starred in over 200 films in his career; however, post Chomana Dudi, he only played minor roles.

B. Saroja Devi is One of the most successful female leads in the history of Indian cinema, she acted in around 200 films in over six decades. She is known by the epithets "Abinaya Saraswathi" (Saraswati of acting) in Kannada and "Kannadathu Paingili" (Kannada's Parrot) in Tamil.

Neo-realistic cinema

Kannada Cinema majorly contributed to the parallel cinema movement of India. Directors like Girish Kasaravalli, Girish Karnad, G. V. Iyer were the early names to join the movement. T. S. Nagabharana and B. V. Karanth were also popular names in the movement. Puttanna Kanagal's films were however considered a bridge between Mainstream and Parallel Cinema.

Modern era
Prakash Raj began his acting career with Doordarshan serials such as Bisilu Kudure (Kannada) and Guddada Bhootha (Tulu and Kannada). He later took up supporting roles in Kannada films such as Ramachari, Ranadheera, Nishkarsha and Lockup Death. He was known for his dialogue delivery and histrionics. His breakthrough role came in Harakeya Kuri, directed by K. S. L. Swamy starring Vishnuvardhan, with whom he had acted in other films such as Mithileya Seetheyaru, Muthina Haara and Nishkarsha. Prakash re-entered Kannada films through Nagamandala in 1997, directed by T. S. Nagabharana. Veteran Kannada actor Shakti Prasad's son Arjun Sarja is known for his work in South Indian cinema. He starred in movies such as Prasad; the film was screened at the Berlin Film Festival and Arjun received the Karnataka State Award for his performance in it.

Sanchari Vijay's portrayal of a transgender won him the National Best Actor Award. With the award, Vijay became the third actor after M. V. Vasudeva Rao, and Charuhasan to win the National Award for Best Actor for a performance in a Kannada film.

Shiva Rajkumar is known for his work in Janumada Jodi, Anand, Ratha Sapthami, Nammoora Mandara Hoove, Om, Simhada Mari and Chigurida Kanasu. He acted in Sugreeva, which was shot in 18 hours. His Om, directed by Upendra, set a trend of gangster movies in Kannada and other film industries in India. It continues to be shown even to this day.

Rockline Venkatesh founded Rockline Entertainments which has produced over twenty five films as of 2012. New age actors - Yash, Darshan, Puneeth Rajkumar, Rakshit Shetty and Sudeepa are some of the highest paid actors in Sandalwood. The Rakshit Shetty starrer Kirik Party went on to become one of the highest-grossing Kannada films by collecting ₹ 50 crores against a production budget ₹ 4 crores and completed 150 days in the main cities of Karnataka.

The 2015 release RangiTaranga starring Nirup Bhandari and directed by Anup Bhandari, created overseas market for Kannada cinema with a mega release, amassing $318,000 in USA alone. It went on to become the first Kannada film to enter the New York Box office listing, the first Kannada film to complete 50 days in USA and the first Kannada movie ever to release in several countries across the world. It ran for 365 days in Bangalore.

In 2018, Yash starrer K.G.F: Chapter 1 became the first Kannada film to gross ₹250 crores at the box office. Its sequel, K.G.F: Chapter 2 (2022) made ₹ 1000 crores at the box office. Its teaser gained more than 250 million views on YouTube as of April 2022. In 2022, Yash starrer K.G.F: Chapter 2 became the highest-grossing Kannada film of all time with a record collection of over ₹1000 crores within India itself. Kananda cinema is reported to have 8% market share in the gross domestic box office collections for the period January to July 2022 making it the fourth biggest Indian film industry.

Film scores
Composer Hamsalekha is usually referred to by the title Naadha Brahma ( The Brahma of Music) who is considered to be the major cause for the change in the music composing and lyric writing style which would appeal much to the younger generation. He integrated folk and introduced western musical sensibilities into the Kannada cinema.

Mano Murthy scored the blockbuster film Mungaru Male starring Ganesh and Pooja Gandhi. Upon the album's release, it topped the charts with the song "Anisuthide" receiving significant radio and TV air time. The album emerged as a massive success topping every Kannada music chart. It was reported that by mid-May 2007, over 200,000 copies were sold in compact discs.

International recognition
The 1964 movie Naandi  set a landmark by being the first ever Kannada film to be screened at an international film festival. It was screened at IFFI 1992 Kannada cinema Retrospect. The 1969 movie Uyyale was screened twice at the IFFI retrospect - once in 1992 and again in 2019.

The 1970 movie Samskara won the Bronze Leopard at Locarno International Film Festival The 1977 movie Ghatashraddha which had the distinction of being shown at the Museum of Modern Art, New York, became the only Indian film to be chosen by the National Archive of Paris among 100 others, during the centenary celebrations of cinema.
It also won the Ducats Award at the Manneham Film Festival Germany. At the 2009 International Film Festival of India, it was announced one of the 20 best films in Indian cinema, having received 1.6 million votes. The 1978 movie Ondanondu Kaladalli was released at The Guild Theatre, 50 Rockefeller Plaza on 17 May 1982. Vincent Canby, the chief film critic of The New York Times, called the movie "that is both exotic as well as surprising in view of all the bodies on the ground at the end, sweet natured!". The film was subtitled into English for its American premiere on 18 October 1995 in Shriver Hall at the Johns Hopkins University as part of the 1995 Milton S. Eisenhower Symposium "Framing Society : A Century of Cinema".

The 1987 film Pushpaka Vimana featured retrospectively in the Shanghai International Film Festival and Whistling Woods Film Festival.

The 1999 film Upendra was screened at the Yubari International Fantastic Film Festival in Japan in 2001. The 1999 movie Deveeri was selected for 18 international film festivals including the 44th London International Film Festival and the Cairo International Film Festival.

The 2000 movie Munnudi was screened at Palm Springs International Film Festival (2002). The 2002 movie Atithi was screened at Cairo International Film Festival. The 2002 movie Dweepa was screened at the Moscow International Film Festival. The 2004 movie Hasina was screened at Berlin's Asia Pacific Film Festival. The 2004 movie Bimba was selected for the Bangkok International Film Festival. The 2006 movie Thutturi won the Best Audience Award at the 9th Dhaka International Film Festival.
and won the Earth Vision Award of 2005-06 at the 15th Tokyo Global Environmental Film Festival. The 2006 movie Naayi Neralu was screened at six international film festivals including International Film Festival Rotterdam, Bangkok International Film Festival, Palm Springs International Film Festival , Osian's Film Festival and the Karachi International Film Festival. The 2006 movie Care of Footpath was selected for the Kids for Kids Film Festival at Cyprus and the 2006 film Cyanide was selected for the London Film Festival.

The 2010 movie Kanasemba Kudureyaneri  won the NETPAC Award at the Asiatica Film Mediale (Italy) (2010). The 2011 film Koormavatara was screened in 17 film festivals and won acclaims at the film festivals of Bangkok, New York and Vancouver. The 2013 movie Lucia premiered at the London Indian Film Festival on 20 July 2013. It won the Best Film Audience Choice award at the festival. It was also screened at the Zurich Film Festival. The 2015 movie Thithi won accolades at multiple international film festivals including the 68th Locarno International Film Festival and the 19th Shanghai International Film Festival. The 2016 movie Railway Children won the Ecumenical Jury Award (special mention) at Zlín Film Festival. The 2016 film Bombeyaata won three awards at seven International Film Festivals. The 2018 movie Nathicharami and Balekempa were screened at the MAMI Mumbai Film Festival. Balekempa also won the FIPRESCI Award at the 47th International Film Festival Rotterdam. The 2019 movie Arishadvarga also premiered at the London Indian Film Festival followed by the Asian Premiere at the Singapore South Asian International Film Festival and the North American Premiere at the Vancouver International South Asian Film Festival. The 2019 movie Manaroopa won 10 awards at various international film festivals including the  Best Thriller Film at Out of the Can International Film Festival at England, Best Experimental Film at the Cafe Irani Chaii International Film Festival  and was officially selected for the Miami Independent Film Festival in the United States and the Istanbul Film Awards in Turkey.

In the post - pandemic era, Kannada cinema started making waves across the world in several international film festivals. Pinki Elli?  was screened at around 50 International Film Festivals including the Prague International Film Festival and the Hainan International Film Festival. It opened the Busan International Film Festival and was screened at Hong Kong International Film Festival. It won three awards at the New York Indian Film Festival. It also won the Best Film award at the Asian Film Festival Barcelona 2021. Amruthamathi was screened at ten international film festivals including Boston Film Festival , Atlanta Film Festival , Austria Film Festival and won multiple awards. Abhilash Shetty's Koli Taal premiered at the 21st New York Indian Film Festival. It was then screened at various film festivals including the 18th Indian Film Festival of Stuttgart  and the 12th Indian Film Festival of Melbourne. Neeli Hakki was selected for multiple international Film festivals including the New York Indian Film Festival. Daari Yaavudayya Vaikunthakke ? won a total of 94 awards  including multiple awards at Rajasthan Film Festival   and other international film festivals like Sundance Film Festival, Barcelona, Nawada  and Golden Sparrow International Film Festivals. Illiralaare Allige Hogalaare  won the Director's Vision Award at the 18th Indian Film Festival of Stuggart. It was earlier screened at the Dhaka International Film Festival and had won an award at the Rome Film Festival. It also won award at the Spain International Film Festival in Madrid. Baraguru Ramachandrappa's Mooka Nayaka won the Best Picture of the Decade Award by competing with movies from different languages around the globe. Jeevnane Nataka Samy (2021) was screened at Miami International Film Festival. Avalakki Pavalakki  won five awards in various categories at Uravatti International Film Festival, Indo Global International Film Festival, American Golden Pictures International Film Festival, Oniros Film Festival and the Sweden Film Festival. Rudri won multiple awards at Oniros Film Festival, Tagore International Film Festival and the Vindhya International Film Festival. Naanu Ladies had its world premier at the 16th Tasveer South Asian Film Festival in Seattle. It went on to win the Best Narrative Feature Award at the Kashish Mumbai International Queer Film Festival.

Pedro had its world premiere in the New Currents Section at the 26th edition of the Busan International Film Festival. and was shortlisted for the Directors Fortnight Cannes 2020. It went on to win the Best Director Award in the Crouching Tigers competition section at the Pingyao International Film Festival in Shanxi, China. It was also the joint winner of the Montgolfiere D'Argent Award at the Festival Des 3 Continents, France. It was also screened at the Indian Film Festival of Los Angeles(IFFLA) and at the Indian Film Festival of Melbourne.Dollu was screened at the Dhaka International Film Festival. It was shortlisted for screening at 72nd Berlinale's European Film Market and the Dallas ft worth South Asian Film Festival (virtual). It was also screened at the Caleidoscope Indian Film Festival Boston where it won the Best Indian Film award. It also won the Best Kannada Movie award at Innovative International Film Festival. Namma Magu received recognition from the International Organization for Migration (IOM).

Taledanda (2022) was selected for London International Film Festival. Koli Esru was selected for screening at New York Indian Film Festival (2022). Shivamma was selected for Marche du Film (2022) - the business counterpart of the Cannes Film Festival. It was also screened at the 27th Busan International Film Festival where it won the New Currents Award given to first or second feature film of a new Asian director. It also won the Young Jury Award at the 44th edition of the Three Continents Festival. It was also selected for screening at the US and Australian film festivals in 2023. Man Of The Match (2022), produced by Puneeth Rajkumar, was selected for screening at the 14th New York City Independent Film Festival in the foreign film category. In 2022, Shuddhi (2017) and Bell Bottom (2019) premiered at the Indian Film Week in Japan. Vagachi Pani was selected for the co-production market at the film festival in Busan. Thayi Kastur Gandhi was screened at LA Film Festival and it won the Best Editor award at the Dallas International Film Festival.

National recognition
 The song Baare Baare from the 1972 movie Naagarahaavu was the first slow-motion song of Indian cinema.
 The 1986 movie Anuraga Aralithu was the first Indian movie to be remade in seven other languages.
 The 1986 movie Africadalli Sheela was the first Indian movie to be shot in African forests.
 The 1987 movie Ondu Muttina Kathe was the first Indian film to have an underwater action sequence shot in an ocean outside India without the help of oxygen mask.
 The 1989 movie Idu Saadhya created a record by becoming the first Indian movie to be shot within a span of 36 hours.
 The 1995 movie Om is the only Indian movie to have been re-released 550 times.
 The 2005 movie Shanti was the second Indian film to enter the Guinness Book of World Records in the Fewest actors in a narrative film category. It had only one actor with the other characters represented through voice and no physical appearance.
 The 2006 Kannada movie Mungaru Male was the first Indian movie to run for a year in a multiplex.
 The 2022 film K.G.F: Chapter 2 became the first movie to gross more than ₹400 crores within India in its opening weekend. It also became the first South Indian movie to gross more than ₹550 crores in its opening weekend.
 The 2022 film Kantara collected ₹25.5 crore in its sixth weekend which was reported to be the highest sixth weekend collection as well as the highest sixth week collection for an Indian movie.

Awards

Dadasaheb Phalke Awardees

National Film Award for Best Feature Film

National Film Award for Best Popular Film

State Recognition

 Karnataka State Film Awards
 Udaya Film Awards
 Suvarna Film Awards

State film festivals 
 Bangalore International Film Festival

Other awards 
 Filmfare Awards South
 SIIMA Awards
 IIFA Utsavam
 Mirchi Music Awards South
 South Scope Awards
 Chandanavana Film Critics Academy Awards
 Hello Gandhinagara Awards

Film schools
The first government institute in India to start technical courses related to films was established in 1941 named as occupational institute then called the Sri Jayachamarajendra (S J) Polytechnic in Bangalore. In September 1996, two specialised courses, Cinematography and Sound & Television were separated and the Government Film and Television Institute was started at Hesaraghatta, under the World Bank Assisted Project for Technician Development in India.

See also
 List of Kannada-language films
 Media in Karnataka
 Cinema of India
 Media of India
 List of Kannada film actresses
 List of Highest-grossing Kannada films

References

External links
 

 
Cinema of Karnataka
Kannada-language films